Caroline Sarah "Sally" Low (née Howard; 23 March 1876 – 10 August 1934) was a New Zealand teacher, social reformer and peace campaigner. She was born in Loburn, New Zealand, on 23 March 1876.

References

1876 births
1934 deaths
New Zealand educators
New Zealand activists
New Zealand women activists
People from North Canterbury